Fußball-Club St Pauli von 1910 e.V., commonly known as simply FC St Pauli, is a German professional football club based in the St. Pauli district of Hamburg, that competes in the 2. Bundesliga.

The football department is part of a larger sports club that also has departments in rugby (FC St. Pauli Rugby), baseball, bowling, boxing (FC St. Pauli Boxen), chess, cycling, handball, roller derby (Harbor Girls Hamburg), skittles, softball, and table tennis and since 2011 Marathon. Until the end of 2013, the club also had a department in American football, but it was dissolved because it lacked the youth team required in order to hold a men's team. FC St. Pauli has 27,000 members as of November 2018.

The men's professional football team dropped down to the Regionalliga in 2003, at that time the third highest football division in Germany and remained there for four years. In 2007, they won promotion back to the 2. Bundesliga and in 2010, they were promoted to the Bundesliga, the highest division. After relegation, since the 2011–12 season they have played in 2. Bundesliga, the second-highest division in Germany.

FC St Pauli has a cross-city rivalry with Hamburger SV; the matches between the two are known as the Hamburger Stadtderby or simply Derby. The club also has a more recent rivalry with Hansa Rostock.

Although the footballers have enjoyed only modest success on the field, the club is widely recognised for its distinctive social culture and has a large popular following as one of the country's "Kult" clubs, which has now developed beyond Germany. FC St. Pauli supporters are strongly identified with their support of left-wing politics.

History

Early years
The club began its existence in 1899 as a loose, informal group of football enthusiasts within the Hamburg-St.Pauli Turn-Verein 1862. This group did not play its first match until 1907, when they faced a similar side assembled from the local Aegir swimming club. Officially established on 15 May 1910, the club played as St. Pauli TV in the Kreisliga Groß-Hamburg (Alsterkreis) until 1924, when a separate football side called St. Pauli was formed. The team played as an undistinguished lower-to-mid table side until making their first appearance in 1934 in the top-flight Gauliga Nordmark, 1 of 16 premier level divisions created in the re-organization of German football that took place under the Third Reich. They were immediately relegated, but returned to the top flight in 1936. Relegated again in 1940, St. Pauli re-appeared in the Gauliga Hamburg in 1942, and played there until the end of World War II.

Post-war football

After the war, the club resumed play in the Oberliga Nord in 1947. A second-place finish in the 1947–48 season led St. Pauli to its first appearance in the national championship rounds. They advanced as far as the semi-finals, where they were knocked out 2–3 by eventual champions 1. FC Nürnberg. The club continued to play well throughout the early 1950s, but were unable to overtake rivals Hamburger SV, finishing in second place in five of the next seven seasons, and going out in the early rounds in each of their championship-round appearances from 1949 to 1951. In the late 1950s and into the early 1960s, St. Pauli were overtaken by rivals such as Werder Bremen and VfL Osnabrück, but finished fourth a number of times.

Promotion to the Bundesliga
In 1963, the Bundesliga – West Germany's new top-flight professional league – was formed. Hamburger SV, Werder Bremen, and Eintracht Braunschweig joined the new circuit as the top-finishers from the Oberliga Nord, while FC St. Pauli found themselves in the second-tier Regionalliga Nord. That year, the club signed Guy Acolatse, who became the first Black professional footballer to play in Germany.

Nearly a decade-and-a-half of frustration followed. St. Pauli won their division in 1964, but finished bottom of their group in the promotion play-off round. They took their next Regionalliga Nord title in 1966 and, while they performed far better in the play-offs, still failed to advance to the top-flight, losing out to Rot-Weiss Essen on goal difference, having conceded two more goals. Division championships in 1972 and 1973, and runner-up finishes in 1971 and 1974, were each followed by promotion-round play-off disappointment.

The success of the Bundesliga, and the growth of professional football in West Germany, led to the formation of the 2. Bundesliga in 1974. St. Pauli was part of the new second-tier professional circuit in the 2. Bundesliga Nord and in 1977, they finally advanced to the top flight as winners of their division. The team survived just one season at the highest level in the Bundesliga.

The club's return to the 2. Bundesliga Nord was also short-lived. On the verge on bankruptcy in 1979, they were denied a license for the following season and were sent down to the Oberliga Nord (III). Strong performances that set the team atop that division in 1981 and 1983 were marred by poor financial health. By 1984, the club had recovered sufficiently to return to the 2. Bundesliga, overtaking Werder Bremen's amateur side who, despite finishing two points ahead of St. Pauli, were ineligible for promotion.

"Kult" phenomenon

It was in the mid-1980s that St. Pauli's transition from a standard traditional club into a "Kult" club began. The club was also able to turn the location of its ground in the dock area part of town, near Hamburg's famous Reeperbahn – centre of the city's night life and its red-light district – to its advantage. An alternative fan scene slowly emerged, built around left-leaning politics, social activism and the event and party atmosphere of the club's matches. Supporters adopted the skull and crossbones as their own unofficial emblem. St. Pauli became the first team in Germany to officially ban right-wing nationalist activities and displays in its stadium in an era when fascist-inspired football hooliganism threatened the game across Europe. In 1981, the team was averaging small crowds of only 1,600 spectators, but by the late 1990s they were frequently selling out their entire 20,000-capacity ground.

The skull and crossbones symbol had always been associated with St Pauli (the city quarter) in one way or another. Hamburg fostered the most famous pirate of Germany, Klaus Störtebeker, and the symbol had been used by the 1980s squatters at Hafenstraße. However, the one who should be credited with finally bringing the symbol to the terraces is probably Doc Mabuse, the singer of a Hamburg punk band. As the legend tells, he first grabbed the flag from a stall while passing drunk through the Dom on his way to the Millerntor-Stadion.

In the early 1990s, the media in Germany began to recognize the Kult-image of the club, focusing on the punk part of the fan-base in TV broadcasts of the matches. By this time, the media also started to establish nicknames like "Freibeuter der Liga" ("Buccaneers of the League") as well as the satirical "das Freudenhaus der Liga" ("Brothel of the League", literally "House of Joy").

St. Pauli moved in and out of the Bundesliga over the course of the next dozen years: the club was narrowly relegated to the Oberliga in the 1984–85 season, but won the 1985–86 championship and returned to 2. Bundesliga. Two increasingly strong years followed, resulting in promotion and three seasons in the Bundesliga, from 1988 to 1991. Four seasons followed in 2. Bundesliga, and then another two in the Bundesliga In 1995 to 1997, before another return to the 2. Bundesliga.

Into the new millennium

Until 2010, the club's most recent appearance in the top-flight had been a single-season cameo in 2001–02. A win against Bayern Munich, the reigning Intercontinental Cup winners, led to the popular "Weltpokalsiegerbesieger" ("World Club Champion beaters") shirts. However, the team finished last in the league, partly because the management did not trust the team which surprisingly won the promotion in 2001, but rather spent the additional money from Bundesliga TV contracts and advertisements on expensive but disappointing players. After the relegation to the 2. Bundesliga, only a skeleton of the successful 2001 team remained. The 2002–03 season ended up in chaos, with the team fighting relegation (ultimately in vain) from the very beginning, various coaches departing and other problems internal to the club.

With the club almost bankrupt again and the less-lucrative Regionaliga Nord (III) looming, the club began its fund-raising activities, the so-called "Retteraktion". They printed t-shirts with the club's crest surrounded by the word Retter ("rescuer/saviour") and more than 140,000 were sold within six weeks. They also organized a lucrative benefit game, against Bayern Munich, to raise funds to save the club.

The club has also been active in terms of charity and in 2005 the club, the team and the fans initiated the Viva con Agua de Sankt Pauli campaign, which collects money for water-dispensers for schools in Cuba, for clean water in Rwanda et cetera.

During the 2005–06 season, the team enjoyed unprecedented success in the DFB-Pokal, with wins over Burghausen, VfL Bochum and, significantly, Bundesliga sides Hertha BSC and, in the quarter-finals on 25 January 2006, Werder Bremen. Their 3–1 victory in front of a sell-out Millerntor crowd, and their subsequent place in the DFB Cup semi-final, netted the club approximately €1 million in TV and sponsorship money, going a long way to saving the club from immediate financial ruin.

St. Pauli finally went out of the cup to Bayern Munich on 12 April, going down 3–0 with a goal from Owen Hargreaves and two from Claudio Pizarro. Coincidentally, Bayern were also St. Pauli's opponents and dispatchers in the first round of the following season's cup.

After success in the 2006–07 season, the team was promoted to the 2. Bundesliga. After defeating SpVgg Greuther Fürth in the 2009–10 season, the team secured promotion back to the Bundesliga for the 2010–11 season. On 16 February 2011, during the 2010–11 season and for the first time since 1977, St Pauli defeated their bitter cross-city rivals Hamburger SV away at the Volksparkstadion courtesy of a Gerald Asamoah goal. The team, however, finished the domestic season in last place, resulting in their relegation to the 2. Bundesliga for the 2011–12 season. Since then, the club has remained in the 2. Bundesliga, finishing fourth in 2011–12 but declining in results since then.

Honours

League
 2. Bundesliga (II)
Runners-up : 1987–88, 1994–95, 2009–10
 2. Bundesliga Nord (II)
 Champions : 1977
 Regionalliga Nord (II)
 Champions : 1963–64, 1965–66, 1971–72, 1972–73
 Regionalliga Nord (III)
 Champions : 2007
 Oberliga Nord (III)
 Champions : 1981, 1983, 1986
 Stadtliga Hamburg (I)
 Champions : 1947

Cup
 Hamburger Pokal
 Winners: 1986, 2004, 2005, 2006

Reserve team
 Oberliga Hamburg/Schleswig-Holstein (IV)
 Champions: 1995, 1999, 2003
 Oberliga Hamburg (V)
 Champions: 2011
 Hamburger Pokal
 Winners: 1998, 2001, 2008

Kit
Historically the colors of the St. Pauli are brown and white, and to a lesser extent red.

During the 21st century, LGBT details were integrated into the third shirt.

Sponsors

Recent seasons
The club's recent seasons:

Supporters

St. Pauli enjoys a certain fame for the left-leaning character of its supporters: most of the team's fans regard themselves as anti-racist, anti-fascist, anti-homophobic and anti-sexist, and this has on occasion brought them into conflict with neo-Nazis and hooligans at away games. The organization has adopted an outspoken stance against racism, fascism, sexism, and homophobia and has embodied this position in its constitution. Team supporters traditionally participate in demonstrations in the St. Pauli district of Hamburg, including those over squatting or low-income housing, such as the Hafenstraße and Bambule. The centre of fan activity is the Fanladen St. Pauli.

Partly because of shared leftist political views, St. Pauli fans have strong relationships with supporters of Ternana, Unione Calcio Sampdoria, Rayo Vallecano, Club Universidad Nacional, SV Babelsberg 03, Hapoel Tel Aviv, AEK Athens (Original 21), Celtic and Oakland Roots. In the past they also had a friendship with the fans of Bohemians 1905 and Partizan Minsk. The group Ultrá Sankt Pauli also has a special friendship with the group Schickeria München, from the ultras scene of Bayern Munich. A banner of the Schickeria München is occasionally displayed at the Millerntor Stadion, and a flag of the Ultrá Sankt Pauli – sporting a picture of Che Guevara – has been displayed at the Allianz Arena. Both Ultrá Sankt Pauli and Schickeria München are members of Alerta Network, an international anti-fascist network of supporter groups.

The club prides itself on having the largest number of female fans in all of German football. In 2002, advertisements for the men's magazine Maxim were removed from the Millerntor-Stadion in response to fans' protests over the adverts' sexist depictions of women. In 2011, the club banned lap dancers from performing during match before guests at a corporate suite, following fans' complaints. The suite belonged to local lap dance club Susies Show Bar.

St. Pauli is also a worldwide symbol for punk and related subcultures. The skull and crossbones logo and the team's brown and white football jerseys have often been worn by international artists such as the bands Asian Dub Foundation, Gaslight Anthem and Panteon Rococo. The KMFDM frontman and Hamburg native Sascha Konietzko is a recognisable St. Pauli fan, at one point placing a huge picture of a fist smashing a swastika on his band's main page, with the caption "St. Pauli Fans gegen Rechts!" ("St. Pauli fans against the Right") underneath it. American punk band Anti-Flag can be seen wearing St. Pauli shirts in numerous music videos for their album American Fall. Another notable supporter and sponsor is Andrew Eldritch, lead singer of band The Sisters of Mercy. On his 2006 "Sisters Bite The Silver Bullet"- tour, Eldritch wore the famous skull and crossbones shirt. Georg Holm, the bassist of the Icelandic post rock band Sigur Rós, has performed at several festivals wearing a St. Pauli T-shirt. Alex Rosamilia, the guitarist for The Gaslight Anthem, frequently wears a St. Pauli hat and hoodie and displays a flag of the club's logo in front of the speakers of his guitar amp. Editors guitarist and synthesiser player Chris Urbanowicz frequently wears the skull and crossbones t-shirt. Dave Doughman, the singer for Dayton, Ohio's Swearing at Motorists, who has been spotted in concert with the skull and crossbones on his guitar and amplifier, moved to St. Pauli in 2010. Bad Religion played a charity match against St. Pauli's third team in 2000. German musicians that are fans include: Fettes Brot, Die Ärzte singer/drummer/songwriter Bela B., Kettcar, Tomte and many other bands, most of them underground.

Several bands have also made music directly related to St. Pauli: The Norwegian punk rock band Turbonegro recorded a special version of their song "I Got Erection" with re-worked German lyrics for St. Pauli. In 2009, Italian ska combat-folk punk band Talco from Marghera, Venice, wrote the song "St Pauli". The team has since used the song as an anthem and Talco has played a number of concerts at Millerntor-Stadion. Glasgow band The Wakes have also played the Millerntor, having written "The Pirates of the League" about the club. Also, British band Art Brut has written a song about the club called "St Pauli" which is featured on their album It's a Bit Complicated. In 2010, FC St. Pauli celebrated its 100th anniversary. For the occasion, the fan club 18auf12 recorded the song "Happy Birthday St.Pauli, One Hundred Beers for You", with words and music by Henning Knorr and Christoph Brüx.

The Canadian punk rock band The Pagans of Northumberland recorded a song in 2014 called simply "St Pauli" for their first 7-inch detailing their love of the club and its supporters around the world.

In January 2017, FC St. Pauli announced an extensive co-operation with Irish-American Celtic punk band Dropkick Murphys. The co-operation includes a strictly limited seven-inch picture disc of the song "You’ll Never Walk Alone" recorded by the band, and new club merchandise labeled "You’ll Never Walk Alone", sporting both the club and the band.

When the team played in Germany's 2nd Bundesliga, their home fixtures at the Millerntor used to average greater attendances than any other team and often exceeded turnouts for second division teams. As of the 2011–12 season, St. Pauli is the only team that has close to 100% in average home attendance.

In 2006, St. Pauli had more season ticket holders than many Bundesliga teams. One study estimated that the team has roughly 11 million fans throughout Germany, making the club one of the most widely recognised German sides. The number of official fan clubs in 2011 passed 500 which is an increase of 300 over three years.

In January 2020, the club's famous skull and crossbones flag was listed by the United Kingdom's counter-terrorism police in a guide sent to public sector workers, to notice potential extremism, prompting a backlash from St Pauli's Welsh defender James Lawrence.

Club culture
St. Pauli opens its home matches with "Hells Bells" by AC/DC, and after every home goal "Song 2" by Blur is played.

The former club president Corny Littmann, long active in German theatre and head of the Schmidt Theater on the Reeperbahn, is openly gay.

St. Pauli have made pre-season appearances at Wacken Open Air, a heavy metal festival, several times.

The club hosted the 2006 FIFI Wild Cup, a tournament made up of unrecognised national football teams like Greenland, Tibet and Zanzibar. They participated as the "Republic of St. Pauli".

In 2008, Nike commemorated the club with two exclusive Dunk shoes, both released in limited quantities. The High Dunk (featuring a black colorway, and the skull and crossbones symbol) was released to all countries throughout Europe, with only 500 pairs produced. The Low Dunk (featuring a smooth white colorway, and holding the team's logo impregnated in the side panel leather) was released only to shops in Germany, Switzerland and Austria, with only 150 pairs produced.

Fundamental Principles
St. Pauli were the first club in Germany to integrate a set of Fundamental Principles (Leitlinien) to dictate how the club is run. The Fundamental Principles were passed by an overwhelming majority at the St. Pauli Congress in 2009 and they go beyond solely football.

The first five Principles states that:

– "In its totality, consisting of members, staff, fans and honorary officers, St. Pauli FC is a part of the society by which it is surrounded and so is affected both directly and indirectly by social changes in the political, cultural and social spheres."

– "St. Pauli FC is conscious of the social responsibility this implies, and represents the interests of its members, staff, fans and honorary officers in matters not just restricted to the sphere of sport."

– "St. Pauli FC is the club of a particular city district, and it is to this that it owes its identity. This gives it a social and political responsibility in relation to the district and the people who live there."

– "St. Pauli FC aims to put across a certain feeling for life and symbolises sporting authenticity. This makes it possible for people to identify with the club independently of any sporting successes it may achieve. Essential features of the club that encourage this sense of identification are to be honoured, promoted and preserved."

– "Tolerance and respect in mutual human relations are important pillars of the St. Pauli philosophy."

Stadium
The home venue of the FC St Pauli is the Millerntor-Stadion. Work on the stadium began in 1961, but its completion was delayed until 1963 as there was initially no drainage system in place, making the pitch unplayable after rain. It originally held 32,000 supporters, but the capacity was later reduced for safety reasons.

In 1970, the stadium was renamed the Wilhelm Koch-Stadium in honour of a former club president. However, this name became highly controversial when it was discovered that Wilhelm Koch had been a member of the Nazi Party during the war. After protests by fans, the name was changed back to Millerntor-Stadion in 1999.

A total redevelopment began in 2006. The final phase of the redevelopment work ended with the completion of the new north stand in July 2015. The stadium is since then permitted for a capacity of 29,546 spectators of which 16,940 are standing and 12,606 are seated.

The stadium is located next to the Heiligengeistfeld, and is overlooked by the infamous Flak Tower IV to the north and a building of the Deutsche Telekom to the south. It can easily be reached with the Hamburg U-Bahn line U3 (St. Pauli Station and Feldstrasse Station).

Players

Current squad

Out on loan

FC St. Pauli II

Notable players

International players
The following international players have also played for St. Pauli:

 Yakubu Adamu
 Moudachirou Amadou
 Gerald Asamoah
 Zlatan Bajramović
 Deniz Barış
 Jonathan Beaulieu-Bourgault
 Alfred Beck
 Morten Berre
 Mourad Bounoua
 Paul Caligiuri
 Armando Cooper
 Cory Gibbs
 Marc Gouiffe à Goufan
 Joe Gyau
 Heino Hansen
 Ari Hjelm
 Junior Hoilett
 Uğur İnceman
 Henry Isaac
 Ivan Klasnić
 Ivo Knoflíček
 Ján Kocian
 Max Kruse
 James Lawrence
 Alireza Mansourian
 Michael Mason
 Frantz Mathieu
 Artur Maxhuni
 Michél Mazingu-Dinzey
 Karl Miller
 Kazuo Ozaki
 Tore Pedersen
 Miguel Francisco Pereira
 Fafà Picault
 Nikolai Pisarev
 Andriy Polunin
 Ingo Porges
 Christian Rahn
 Yuri Savichev
 Helmut Schön
 Feiz Shamsin
 Rocky Siberie
 Waldemar Sobota
 Ive Sulentic
 Charles Takyi
 Jean-Clotaire Tsoumou-Madza
 Niels Tune-Hansen
 Yang Chen
 Carlos Zambrano
 Sáu Dũng

Greatest ever team
In 2010, as part of the club's celebration of its 100th anniversary, fans voted the following players as the best in the club's history:

 Klaus Thomforde
 André Trulsen
 Walter Frosch
 Karl Miller
 Dirk Dammann
 Michél Mazingu-Dinzey
 Thomas Meggle
 Jürgen Gronau
 Harald Stender
 Peter Osterhoff
 Franz Gerber

Player records
Note: FC St. Pauli did not play in the Bundesliga or the 2. Bundesliga until 1974, 1979–1984, 1985–86 and 2003–2007.
Statistics are correct as of 22 June 2022.

Most appearances overall
BL = Bundesliga, 2.BL = 2. Bundesliga, OLN = Oberliga Nord (1947–1963), RLN = Regionalliga Nord (1963–1974)  OtL = Other leagues: Oberliga Nord (1974–1994), Regionalliga Nord (since 1994)  Cup = DFB-Pokal, OtC = Other competitions: German championship (1947–1951), Relegation play-offs, Hamburg Cup

Most appearances Bundesliga and 2. Bundesliga

Top goalscorers Bundesliga and 2. Bundesliga
Numbers in brackets indicate appearances made.

Coaching staff

Managerial history

  Walter Risse (1950–52)
  Hans Appel (1952)
  Otto Westphal (1963–64)
  Kurt Krause (1964–65)
  Erwin Türk (1970–71)
  Edgar Preuß (1971–72)
  Karl-Heinz Mülhausen (1972–74)
  Kurt Krause (1974–76)
  Diethelm Ferner (1976–78)
  Sepp Piontek (1978–79)
  Michael Lorkowski (1982–86)
  Willi Reimann (1986–87)
  Helmut Schulte (1987–91)
  Horst Wohlers (1991–92)
  Josef Eichkorn (1992)
  Michael Lorkowski (1992)
  Josef Eichkorn (1992–94)
  Uli Maslo (1994–97)
  Klaus-Peter Nemet (1997)
  Eckhard Krautzun (1997)
  Gerhard Kleppinger (1997–99)
  Willi Reimann (1999–00)
  Dietmar Demuth (2000–02)
  Joachim Philipkowski (2002)
  Franz Gerber (2002–04)
  Andreas Bergmann (2004–06)
  Holger Stanislawski (2006–07)
  André Trulsen (2007–08)
  Holger Stanislawski (2008–11)
  André Schubert (2011–12)
  Michael Frontzeck (2012–13)
  Roland Vrabec (2013–14)
  Thomas Meggle (2014)
  Ewald Lienen (2014–2017)
  Olaf Janßen (2017)
  Markus Kauczinski (2017–19)
  Jos Luhukay (2019–20)
  Timo Schultz (2020–22)

Other sports

The St. Pauli rugby section has several teams, both in the men's and women's leagues.

The men's rugby department has not been as successful as its female counterpart, reaching the German final only once, in 1964. In 2008–09, St. Pauli was the only club to have a team in both the rugby and football 2nd Bundesliga. In 2008–09, the men's team finished fourth in the second division.

The women's team have won the German rugby union championship eight times (1995, 2000, 2001, 2003, 2005–08) and the sevens championship 3 times (2000, 2001 and 2002). Several of their players play in the national squad.

St. Pauli has a blind football team which plays in the Blindenfussball Bundesliga.

St. Pauli also has a Roller Derby team known as Harbor Girls Hamburg.

Notable presidents
 1990–00: Heinz Weisener
 2002–10: Corny Littmann

References

External links

Punk, Politics & Football article on FC St Pauli by N by Norwegian
A brief guide to FC St Pauli video on YouTube

 
Football clubs in Hamburg
Association football clubs established in 1910
Multi-sport clubs in Germany
1910 establishments in Germany
Politics and sports
Bundesliga clubs
Football clubs in Germany
2. Bundesliga clubs